On the Outside is the second studio album by the Denton, Texas punk rock band The Marked Men, released May 18, 2004 by Dirtnap Records.

Track listing
All songs written by The Marked Men
"On the Outside" – 2:22
"Don't Lose It" – 1:21
"Gone Away" – 2:07
"Broken Record" – 1:57
"No Time" – 2:04
"So What" – 1:17
"Right Here with You" – 2:54
"Doctor Dan" – 1:42
"Set You Right" – 2:04
"Still Waiting" – 2:47
"Cool Devices" – 1:26
"4,000 Times" – 2:25
"Master Wicked" – 3:30

Personnel 
Jeff Burke – guitar, lead vocals
Mark Ryan – guitar, lead vocals
Joe Ayoub – bass guitar, backing vocals
Mike Throneberry – drum kit

References

2004 albums
The Marked Men albums